In music recording, mix automation allows the mixing console to remember the audio engineer's adjustment of faders during the post-production editing process. A timecode is necessary for the synchronization of automation. Modern mixing consoles and digital audio workstations use comprehensive mix automation. 

The need for mix automation originates from the 1970s and the changeover from studios mostly using eight-track tape machines to multiple, synchronized 24-track recorders. Mixing could be laborious and require up to four people, and the results could be almost impossible to reproduce. Manufacturers such as Solid State Logic and AMS Neve developed systems that enabled one engineer to oversee every detail of a complex mix, although the computers required to power these desks remained a rarity into the late 1970s.

According to record producer Roy Thomas Baker, Queen's 1975 single "Bohemian Rhapsody" was one of the first mixes to be done with automation.

Types 
Voltage Controlled Automation  fader levels are regulated by voltage-controlled amplifiers (VCA). VCAs control the audio level and not the actual fader.
Moving Fader Automation  a motor is attached to the fader, which then can be controlled by the console, digital audio workstation (DAW), or user.
Software Controlled Automation  the software can be internal to the console, or external as part of a DAW. The virtual fader can be adjusted in the software by the user.
MIDI Automation  the communications protocol MIDI can be used to send messages to the console to control automation.

Modes 
Auto Write  used the first time automation is created or when writing over existing automation
Auto Touch  writes automation data only while a fader is touched/faders return to any previously automated position after release
Auto Latch  starts writing automation data when a fader is touched/stays in position after release
Auto Read  digital Audio Workstation performs the written automation
Auto Off  automation is temporarily disabled

All of these include the mute button. If mute is pressed during writing of automation, the audio track will be muted during playback of that automation.
Depending on software, other parameters such as panning, sends, and plug-in controls can be automated as well.  In some cases, automation can be written using a digital potentiometer instead of a fader.

See also
 Collaborative real-time editor
 Potentiometer
 List of music software

References

 Stanley R. Alten. Audio in Media, sixth edition. Wadsworth, 2002.
 David Miles Huber and Robert Runstein. Modern Recording Techniques, sixth edition. Oxford: Focal Press, 2005.

External links
Free open source Mix automation software

Automation
Audio mixing